Mehrāb Kāboli or Mehrāb, is a character in Persian epic Shahnameh. He is king of Kabol and is most famous for being father of Rudaba and grandfather of her son, the famous Persian hero, Rostam. His wife is Sindukht.

Family tree 

Shahnameh characters